Happiness C.O.D. is a 1935 American romantic comedy film directed by Charles Lamont and starring Maude Eburne, Donald Meek and Irene Ware.

Plot
When meek widower Thomas F. Sherridan, a construction engineer and owner of the Continental Construction Co., receives a telegram from his eldest son Ken informing him of his impending visit home, he promptly organizes a family reunion. Tom's sister Addie, who raised his three children and still manages his household, prepares a special dinner to celebrate Ken's homecoming. Ken, an architect "with new ideas" shows up with a mustache and a new girl friend, department store heiress Beatrice Manning, and announces that he has quit his job. When younger brother Larry and his sister Carroll arrive, the three siblings make plans to dine out, thoughtlessly leaving Tom and Aunt Addie behind. Once alone, Tom reveals to Addie that he is nearly bankrupt, in part because his extravagant offspring have always charged their various purchases to his account. Addie disapproves of this practice and also of Carroll's boyfriend, Jim Martin, who has been separated from his wife since she became an invalid after being seriously injured in a car accident while out with another man. Shortly after his arrival home, Ken, while dining with Beatrice and her father, sees Carroll and Jim together, and later, he tells Carroll that Jim isn't good enough for her.

Meanwhile, Tom insists on keeping his financial woes a secret from his family, and he is harassed by sleazy businessman Lester Walsh, holder of the $20,000 mortgage on Tom's house. Walsh attempts to bribe Tom into approving the use of an inexpensive and inferior cement for the construction of a hospital in which Walsh has an interest. Addie finally tells Ken, Larry and Carroll how dire their father's financial situation is, and realizing the error of their ways, they all resolve to help. Carroll offers to wed Jim in exchange for $20,000, but he refuses, saying that such an arrangement would spoil their relationship. Addie, who has been courted for several years by Sam Townsend, offers him her hand, and he gladly accepts. The Reverend Huxley, an old friend of Addie's, decides to adopt one of Ken's avant-garde designs, previously rejected by the Manning Department Store, for his new tabernacle, a project on which Tom, Ken and Sam are to be partners. The only dark cloud on the horizon is a series of armed robberies in the locale, which Addie fears may have been committed by Larry, who once bragged about owning a gun; however, it is soon discovered that Larry has sold his gun and car and is working as a soda jerk in order to help his father. The balance of the Sherridans' mortgage is mysteriously paid off, and Carroll soon realizes that the anonymous benefactor is none other than Jim, whose wife has recently died. A grateful Ken invites Jim to a celebration at the Sherridan home as he eagerly begins the design of the future house for the newly united family.

Cast
 Maude Eburne as Aunt Addie  
 Donald Meek as Thomas Sherridan  
 Irene Ware as Carroll Sherridan  
 William Bakewell as Ken Sherridan  
 Polly Ann Young as Eleanor  
 Lona Andre as Beatrice Manning  
 Frank Coghlan Jr. as Larry Sherridan  
 Malcolm McGregor as Jim Martin  
 Edwin Maxwell as Lester Walsh  
 Robert McKenzie as Sam Townsend  
 Fred Sumner as Mr. Manning  
 Richard Carlyle as Rev. Huxley  
 John Dilson as Snyder

References

Bibliography
 Michael R. Pitts. Poverty Row Studios, 1929–1940: An Illustrated History of 55 Independent Film Companies, with a Filmography for Each. McFarland & Company, 2005.

External links
 

1935 films
1935 romantic comedy films
American romantic comedy films
Films directed by Charles Lamont
Chesterfield Pictures films
American black-and-white films
1930s English-language films
1930s American films